Shark Bait may refer to:
 Shark baiting, a procedure to attract sharks
 Shark Bait (film), a 2006 South Korean-American computer animated film